Lund is a village and civil parish in the East Riding of Yorkshire, England.

According to the 2011 UK census, Lund parish had a population of 308, an increase on the 2001 UK census figure of 289.

The parish church of All Saints is a Grade II* listed building.

In 1823 Lund  was in the Wapentake of Harthill. In the market place the remains of a market cross was used as a focus to sell goods every Thursday in Lent. The parishioners had erected a public school for an unlimited number of children. Population at the time was 357. Occupations included fifteen farmers, one of whom was in occupation of the seat of a local notable family. There were three shoemakers, three shopkeepers, two tailors, a parish clerk and a parish constable, a schoolmaster, a workhouse governess, a blacksmith, a bricklayer, a saddler, a butcher, and the landlords of The Plough, and The Lord Wellington public house. Three carriers operated between the village and Beverley and Market Weighton twice weekly.

John Fancy, the Second World War airman and escapee from German captivity was born in the village.

In fiction

Location sequences for the village and church of "Hinton St. John" in the 
Robert Donat film Lease of Life (1954) were filmed in Lund, and nearby Beverley.

References

External links

Villages in the East Riding of Yorkshire
Civil parishes in the East Riding of Yorkshire